The Idalion Temple inscriptions are six Phoenician inscriptions found by Robert Hamilton Lang in his excavations at the Temple of Idalium (modern Dali, Cyprus) in 1869, whose work there had been inspired by the discovery of the Idalion Tablet in 1850. The most famous of these inscriptions is known as the Idalion bilingual. The Phoenician inscriptions are known as KAI 38-40 and CIS I 89-94. 

They are currently at the British Museum. The discovery was first announced by Paul Schröder in 1872.

The inscriptions

Notes

1870 archaeological discoveries
Phoenician inscriptions
Archaeological artifacts
KAI inscriptions